Didelphimorphia is an order of marsupial mammals. Members of this order are called didelphimorphs, or opossums. They are primarily found in South America, though some are found in Central America and Mexico and one, the Virginia opossum, ranges into the United States and Canada. Didelphimorphs are primarily found in forests, as well as savannas, shrublands, and grasslands. Almost no population estimates have been made for didelphimorph species, though the one-striped opossum is classified as Critically Endangered with a population of less than ten, Handley's slender opossum is also critically endangered, and the red-bellied gracile opossum is extinct, having last been seen in 1962.

The 93 extant species of Didelphimorphia are grouped into a single family, Didelphidae, which is divided into four subfamilies: Caluromyinae, containing four species in two genera; Glironiinae, containing a single species; Hyladelphinae, also with a single species; and Didelphinae, containing 87 species split between 14 genera. Over one hundred extinct Didelphimorph species have been discovered, though due to ongoing research and discoveries the exact number and categorization is not fixed.

Conventions

Conservation status codes listed follow the International Union for Conservation of Nature (IUCN) Red List of Threatened Species. Range maps are provided wherever possible; if a range map is not available, a description of the didelphimorph's range is provided. Ranges are based on the IUCN Red List for that species unless otherwise noted. All extinct species or subspecies listed alongside extant species went extinct after 1500 CE, and are indicated by a dagger symbol "".

Classification
The order Didelphimorphia consists of one family, Didelphidae, which is divided into the subfamilies Caluromyinae, Glironiinae, Hyladelphinae, and Didelphinae. Caluromyinae contains 4 species in 2 genera, Glironiinae and Hyladelphinae each contain a single species, and Didelphinae contains 87 species in 14 genera, as well as the extinct red-bellied gracile opossum, which was last seen in 1962. Many of these species are further subdivided into subspecies. This does not include hybrid species or extinct prehistoric species.

Family Didelphidae
 Subfamily Caluromyinae
 Genus Caluromys (woolly opossums): three species
 Genus Caluromysiops (black-shouldered opossum): one species
 Subfamily Didelphinae
 Genus Chacodelphys (Chacoan pygmy opossum): one species
 Genus Chironectes (water opossum): one species
 Genus Cryptonanus (savanna gracile opossums): five species (one extinct)
 Genus Didelphis (large American opossums): six species
 Genus Gracilinanus (gracile opossums): six species
 Genus Lestodelphys (Patagonian opossum): one species
 Genus Lutreolina (lutrine opossums): two species
 Genus Marmosa (mouse opossums): seventeen species
 Genus Marmosops (slender opossums): seventeen species
 Genus Metachirus: (brown four-eyed opossums): two species
 Genus Monodelphis (short-tailed opossums): seventeen species
 Genus Philander (gray and black four-eyed opossums): five species
 Genus Thylamys (fat-tailed mouse opossums): nine species
 Genus Tlacuatzin (gray mouse opossums): one species
 Subfamily Glironiinae
 Genus Glironia (bushy-tailed opossum): one species
 Subfamily Hyladelphinae
 Genus Hyladelphys (Kalinowski's mouse opossum): one species

Didelphimorphs
The following classification is based on the taxonomy described by Mammal Species of the World (2005), with augmentation by generally accepted proposals made since using molecular phylogenetic analysis, as supported by both the IUCN and the American Society of Mammalogists.

Subfamily Caluromyinae

Subfamily Didelphinae

Subfamily Glironiinae

Subfamily Hyladelphinae

References

Sources

 
 
 

 
didelphimorphs
didelphimorphs